Sofia Albertina Church is the main church in Landskrona, Sweden. Belonging to the Landskrona Parish of the Church of Sweden, it was inaugurated in 1788 and fully completed in 1816. It is considered a rare church building, in the respect that it has two towers without being a Bishop's church.
The church was originally designed by Carl Hårleman, as perhaps his last greater task. Hårleman died in 1753, the same year as the old church was demolished. Smaller changes to Hårlemans original may have been done.

History
Soon after the foundation of Landskrona as a Danish town, a large church was built and taken in use around 1430, Saint John the Baptist's Church. Of all Scanian churches only the Lund Cathedral was larger. For more than 330 years this church was in use. But after Scania became a part of Sweden in 1720, a military commendant suddenly found out that the church tower was a potential threat to the nearby Landskrona Citadel (if a canon was pulled up to its top). Hence the old medieval church was demolished in 1753.
Although the corner stone to the new Sofia Albertina was put in the following year, Landskrona Town lacked a real church for a third of a century (1754–1787). It was inaugurated in 1788 and fully completed in 1812.

References

External links

18th-century Church of Sweden church buildings
Buildings and structures in Landskrona
Carillons
Churches in Skåne County
Churches in the Diocese of Lund
Churches completed in 1788
1788 establishments in Sweden
18th-century establishments in Skåne County